Of Course, Of Course is the second album by jazz saxophonist Charles Lloyd released on the Columbia label featuring performances by Lloyd with Gábor Szabó, Ron Carter, and Tony Williams. The Allmusic review by Scott Yanow and Thom Jurek awarded the album 4 stars and states "Whether on tenor or flute, Lloyd was quickly coming into his own as an original voice, and this underrated set is a minor classic".

Track listing
All compositions by Charles Lloyd except as indicated
 "Of Course, Of Course" – 4:45  
 "The Song My Lady Sings" – 2:28  
 "The Best Thing for You" (Irving Berlin) – 5:18  
 "The Things We Did Last Summer" (Sammy Cahn, Jule Styne) – 6:08  
 "Apex" – 3:59  
 "One for Joan" – 5:07  
 "Goin' to Memphis" – 3:38  
 "Voice in the Night" – 6:44  
 "Third Floor Richard" – 6:16  
 "East of the Sun (and West of the Moon)" (Brooks Bowman) – 4:54 (Bonus track on CD reissue)  
 "Island Blues" – 3:25 (Bonus track on CD reissue) 
 "Sun Dance" – 3:32 (Bonus track on CD reissue) 
Recorded at Columbia Studio A, New York City on May 8, 1964 (tracks 2–4, 6–7, 10), March 08, 1965 ( tracks 1, 5, 8–9) and October 15, 1965 (tracks 11–12)

Personnel
Charles Lloyd – tenor saxophone, flute
Gábor Szabó – guitar
Ron Carter – bass (tracks 1–3, 5–10)
Tony Williams – drums (tracks 1–3, 5–10)
Albert Stinson – bass (tracks 11–12) 
Pete LaRoca – drums (tracks 11–12)
Robbie Robertson – guitar (track 12)

Production
Roy Halee, Stan Tonkel – recording engineers
Richard Mantel – art direction and design
Bob Cato – cover photography

References

1965 albums
Columbia Records albums
Charles Lloyd (jazz musician) albums
Albums produced by George Avakian
Albums produced by John Simon (record producer)